Songs for Judy is a live album by Canadian / American musician Neil Young, released on November 30, 2018 on Shakey Pictures Records. It is Volume 07 in the Performance Series of Neil Young Archives. The album features recordings from Young's solo acoustic sets during the November 1976 United States tour with Crazy Horse.

In spring 1970, Young toured with Crazy Horse. He opened the shows with a solo acoustic set before bringing out Crazy Horse for a set of electric material.  Live At The Fillmore East documents that tour.

In the fall 1976 tour that Songs For Judy documents, he did the same.  During his acoustic sets, Young played different songs each night rather than the same songs at every show.  As a result he played a total of 22 acoustic songs throughout the course of the tour, each of which appears on Songs For Judy.

In addition, whereas Live at the Fillmore East documents only electric performances and omits acoustic material, Songs For Judy does the opposite and documents only acoustic performances.

Background
Joel Bernstein, whom Young brought on tour as a guitar tech, recorded the shows directly from the PA feed to a cassette desk for personal listening. Together with his friend Cameron Crowe they compiled and sequenced a set of the best performances; a copy of this tape was later stolen and began to circulate among fans as The Joel Bernstein Tapes bootleg. The album features the same performances as the original compilation, with multitrack mixes replacing Bernstein's cassette recordings where possible; unlike the original compilation, songs are set in chronological order of performance dates.

A number of songs performed on the tour were unreleased at the time, including "Too Far Gone" and "White Line" which would appear in studio form years later on Freedom (1989) and Ragged Glory (1990), respectively, and "Give Me Strength," which was featured on 2017 archival release Hitchhiker. The song "No One Seems to Know" makes its first appearance on any official Neil Young release.

The name Songs for Judy originates from Young's story (told in the album introduction) about hallucinating during one of the shows and seeing Judy Garland in the orchestra pit.

Track listing
All songs written by Neil Young.

Personnel
Neil Young – vocals, acoustic guitar, piano, banjo, harmonica, Stringman

Engineering and production
Joel Bernstein, Cameron Crowe, David Briggs, Neil Young – production
Tracks 1–9, 23:
Joel Bernstein – cassette recording
Tim Mulligan – original PA mix
Tracks 10–22:
Dave Hewitt – multitrack recording
Phil Gitamer – assistant engineer
John Nowland, Tim Mulligan – mixing
John Hanlon – post-production
Tim Mulligan – mastering (Redwood Digital)
Chris Bellman – mastering (Bernie Grundman Mastering)
Daryl Hannah – artwork
Alex Tenta – design, layout

Charts

References

2018 live albums
Neil Young live albums
Albums produced by David Briggs (producer)
Albums produced by Neil Young
Judy Garland